Arbën Milori (born 22 November 1969) is a former Albanian professional footballer who played for Dinamo Tirana, Pierikos FC and Partizani Tirana, as well as the Albania national team.

International career
He made his debut for Albania in a May 1991 European Championship qualification match against Czechoslovakia in Tirana and earned a total of 10 caps, scoring no goals. His final international was a November 1995 European Championship qualification match against Wales.

Managerial career
Milori was in charge of Albanian First Division side Olimpiku Tirana in 2013.

Honours
Albanian Superliga: 1
 1990

References

External links

1969 births
Living people
Association football midfielders
Albanian footballers
Albania international footballers
Albania under-21 international footballers
FK Dinamo Tirana players
Pierikos F.C. players
FK Partizani Tirana players
Kategoria Superiore players
Albanian expatriate footballers
Albanian expatriate sportspeople in Greece
Expatriate footballers in Greece
Albanian football managers